Reagan Branch is a stream in Bollinger County in the U.S. state of Missouri.

Reagan Branch has the name of Dr. Mathias M. Reagan, an early settler.

See also
List of rivers of Missouri

References

Rivers of Bollinger County, Missouri
Rivers of Missouri